The Cristero Museum was the only museum in Mexico dedicated to the country's religious conflicts, which lasted from 1767 until the Cristero War in the 1900s. It is located in the city of Aguascalientes, in central Mexico. The museum was opened to the public on 20 March 2003. It was composed of five exhibition rooms with seven themes, through which the background of the conflicts between State power and Church power in Mexico was explained, up to the last impact of the Cristero War. The museum also housed the Captain Efrén Quesada Ibarra Historical Archive, a space dedicated to students and researchers, which housed the largest collection of printed documents and audiovisuals in the country. It has been closed since around 2005 but the collection is said to still exist.

History museums in Mexico
Mexican War of Independence
Mexican Revolution
Museums in Aguascalientes
Defunct museums
2003 establishments in Mexico
Museums established in 2003